Chaudhary Rana Muhammad Abdul Rehman Khan was the Rana of Rahon Jagir and Member of the Punjab Legislative Assembly. (3 January 1927, to 26 July 1930; 24 October 1930, to 10 November 1936; 5 April 1937, to 19 March 1945)

Biography
Chaudhary Rana Muhammad Abdul Rehman Khan was the son of Chaudhary Ameer Muhammad Khan, and was born in Rahon Jullunder and was the chief of the Ghorewaha Rajput tribe. He completed his primary education from Jullunder. Khan became the Rana of Rahon and MLA after the death of Chaudhary Jang Baz Khan who was his elder brother. He was elected a member of the Punjab Legislative Assembly from Jullunder for the first time in 1927, and remained a member of that assembly having won successive elections till 19 March 1945.

After independence in 1947, Khan moved to Pakistan and settled initially in Minchanabad, Bahawal Nagar, and subsequently in Rehmanabad Khanqa Dogran.
His closest companion is Malik wazir khan in Rahon. Wazir khan's family settled in Hafizabad near khanqah dogran.

His daughter Apa Nisar Fatima went on to serve as a minister in the government of General Zia Ul Haq. Ahsan Iqbal is his maternal grandson.

References

 
 
 
 

20th-century Indian monarchs
Punjab, India politicians
Pakistani nobility
Pakistani politicians